Abu Sayyaf was the nom de guerre of a senior leader of the Islamic State of Iraq and the Levant (ISIL) who was described as overseeing gas and oil operations. United States authorities identified Abu Sayyaf's real name as Fathi Ben Awn Ben Jildi Murad al-Tunisi. Abu Sayyaf was killed on the night of May 15–16, 2015 while resisting capture during a United States Army Delta Force operation in eastern Syria.

Death
The operation was conducted to try to capture him and his wife on suspicion of their involvement in, or "deep knowledge" of Islamic State hostage operations. Kayla Mueller is reported to have been a "personal captive" of Abu Sayyaf. No U.S. soldiers were killed or injured during the operation.

It was the first direct action ground raid targeting the militant group by U.S. soldiers inside Syria. (a previous U.S. ground operation in Syria was a rescue mission). Items, including several terabytes of data from laptops, cellphones and other material, were recovered from the scene and exploited for intelligence purposes. More information was collected in the raid than any other in United States special operations forces history.  Among the objects found there are archaeological finds, which prove the involvement of IS in illicit antiquities trade.
The operation was launched from Iraq, with the "full consent of Iraqi authorities."

A senior administration official said that the administration had assessed it likely that Abu Sayyaf was in direct contact with Islamic State leader and self-proclaimed caliph, Abu Bakr al-Baghdadi.

Abu Sayyaf's wife, known by the nom de guerre "Umm Sayyaf" and said to be an ISIL member, was captured during the operation. A young Yazidi woman who appeared to be held as a slave of the couple was freed.

A senior administration official told CNN that Abu Sayyaf was a Tunisian citizen. Hisham al-Hashimi, an Iraqi researcher on ISIL and security threats, said that al-Jabouri was "a close associate of chief ISIS spokesman Abu Mohammed al-Adnani."

References

2015 deaths
Assassinated ISIL members